Paisley Montage is a compilation album by Purling Hiss, released independently in 2011. Before being re-issued by Richie Records in 2013, it was distributed on Compact Cassette by the band during their 2011 tour. In his review for Pitchfork Media, Marc Masters said the album "indulges nicely in Polizze’s preferred tropes-- heavy guitar and a simple, lurching beat-- but eventually descends into an aural madness of searing distortion, echoing voices, and dislocated finger snaps."

Track listing

Personnel
Adapted from the Paisley Montage liner notes.
 Mike Polizze – vocals, instruments

Release history

References

External links 
 

2011 compilation albums
Purling Hiss albums